Qeshlaq-e Sari Quyi may refer to:
Qeshlaq-e Sari Quyi Ahmad Khan
Qeshlaq-e Sari Quyi Mikail
Qeshlaq-e Sari Quyi Shahmar